Jamaica Pond is a kettle lake, part of the Emerald Necklace of parks in Boston designed by Frederick Law Olmsted. It is the source of the Muddy River, which drains into the lower Charles River.USGS 2005

It is ringed by a  walking path, and is an extremely popular destination for Bostonians for walking, fishing, rowing, and sailing. Around Halloween each year, the pond serves as the site for The Lantern Parade. Participants dress in their Halloween costumes and walk around the pond.

The pond once served as a reservoir for the City of Boston and the Town of West Roxbury, and it supplied ice in the winter to Boston and beyond.

According to the USGS, the name Jamaica derives from an Indian name meaning "abundance of beavers".

The pond's setting, Jamaica Park, was included in the Olmsted Park landscape complex that was placed on the National Register of Historic Places on December 8, 1971.

History
The Jamaica Plain Ice Company employed 350 men in 1874, and harvested as much 5,000 tons of ice a day from Jamaica Pond.

The pond was once the site of a popular annual winter skating carnival. In 1929, this carnival was cancelled by Mayor Curley when cracks appeared on the ice, and 50,000 skaters had to be evacuated. In recent years, ice skating is no longer permitted on the pond.

Overlooking Jamaica Pond until its 2007 demolition was Pinebank Mansion, the summer home of Edward Newton Perkins.

Gallery

References
Water resources and the urban environment, lower Charles River Watershed;

External links

MassWildlife map and information
Boston Parks & Recreation Department
Emerald Necklace Conservancy
Friends of Jamaica Pond
Sam Blackman: The Jamaica Pond Project
Boating on Jamaica Pond by Courageous Sailing
Jamaica Pond Lantern Parade by Spontaneous Celebrations

Jamaica Plain, Boston
Parks in Boston
Emerald Necklace
Ice trade